Saldarriaga is a village in the Mexican state of Querétaro. It is located in the municipality of El Marqués. It has 2451 inhabitants, and is located at 1895 meters above sea level.

References

Populated places in Querétaro